

Events

January events
 January 3 – Tired of its cars being routed to the Boston and Maine Railroad by mistake, the Brookville and Mahoning Railroad of Pennsylvania changes its name to the Pittsburg and Shawmut Railroad.
 January 21 – Spanish River derailment: Canadian Pacific Railway's westbound Soo Express passenger train derails as it crosses the bridge over the Spanish River in Northern Ontario, Canada, killing 44 people.
 January 22 – Rebuilt Flinders Street railway station in Melbourne, Australia, officially opened.

February events 
 February 24 – The Cleveland Short Line Railway, a subsidiary of the Lake Shore and Michigan Southern Railway, opens its first  section of track from Rockport to Marcy, Ohio, and a junction with the Lake Erie and Pittsburg Railway.

March events
 March 1 – The Wellington, Washington avalanche sweeps away two Great Northern Railway passenger trains in the Cascade Mountains, killing 96, making it the worst snowslide accident in United States history.
 March 4 – Rogers Pass avalanche kills 62 Canadian Pacific Railway workers clearing the line near the summit of Rogers Pass, making it the worst snowslide accident in Canadian history.
 March 10 – Minoh Arima Electronic Railway Line, Umeda Station of Osaka to Takarazuka Station route officially completed in Japan. (as predecessor of Hankyu Takarazuka Line)

April events
 April 2 – Butzbach-Licher Eisenbahn in Germany opens the section from Bad Nauheim to Rockenberg.

May events 
 May 31 – The Union of South Africa is established and with it the Colonial Government railways, the Cape Government Railways, the Natal Government Railways and the Central South African Railways are merged to form South African Railways.

June events
 June 6 – the US Railroad Safety Appliance Act of 1893 is further extended to mandate that no less than 85% of all railroad cars in an operating train must be equipped with air brakes.

July events
 July 5 – Opening of Bernina Railway (metre gauge, electrified) from St. Moritz, Switzerland, to Tirano, Italy, crossing the Alps at the highest altitude of a through railway in Europe, .
 July 11 – Construction begins on the Sheridan Railway in Sheridan, Wyoming.
 July 18 – A passenger train traveling through dense fog hits a stationary locomotive in Richmond, Victoria, Australia, killing nine people on the moving train.
 July 26 – The London and South Western Railway introduces a new Continental service, Southampton-Havre.

August events 
 August 10 – The Mill Mountain Incline funicular in Roanoke, Virginia, opens for service.
 August 22 – The first Western Pacific Railroad passenger train to operate over the railroad's entire route from Salt Lake City, Utah, arrives in San Francisco, California.

September events
 September 21 – A Fort Wayne and Wabash Valley Traction interurban car overruns a meeting point at Kingsland, Indiana, and smashes head on into a northbound interurban. Forty-one people are killed in the worst accident of the interurban era.

October events
 October 1 – The Great Western Railway of England, abolishes second-class rail fares (first- and third-class remain).
 October 10 – The Kowloon-Canton Railway (British Section)  opens in HK.

November events
 November 27 – The Pennsylvania Railroad opens Pennsylvania Station in New York City together with Manhattan Transfer station and the New Jersey side of the railroad's Hudson River tunnels (built by the Pennsylvania Tunnel and Terminal Railroad).

December events
 December 24 – The Hawes Junction train disaster in Cumbria, England, occurs when a busy signalman forgets about a pair of bank engines waiting at his starting signal and he then allows two trains into the one block section.

Unknown date events 
 The city of Cleveland, Ohio, approves a bond measure to pay for the Nickel Plate Road's grade separation project through the densest part of the city.
 Finnish Railways opens Lanskaya Station in Saint Peterburg, Russia after restructuring by the architect Bruno Granholm.
 The Yunnan metre gauge railway in China is completed from Laokay to Yunnan-fu by French interests.
 First section of Moçâmedes Railway opens in Portuguese Angola.
 Carillon and Grenville Railway closes, the last broad (5' 6") gauge line in Canada.

Births

February births
 February 27 – Francesco di Majo, designer of the Pendolino (died 2011).

May births 
 May 21 – Robert W. Richardson, American railroad historian (died 2007).

Deaths

March deaths
 March 7 – George Whale, Chief Mechanical Engineer of London and North Western Railway 1903–1909 (born 1842).
 March 24 – Gaston du Bousquet, French steam locomotive designer (born 1839).

July deaths
 July 20 – Ira G. Rawn, vice president of Illinois Central Railroad until 1909, president of Monon Railroad 1909-1910, dies from an allegedly self-inflicted gunshot wound (born 1855).

August deaths
 August 2 – Inoue Masaru, Japanese bureaucrat, first Director of Railways, dies on visit to London (born 1843).

References 
 Fry, David (December 4, 1999), Chronology of Australian train accidents. Retrieved July 18, 2005.
 Rivanna Chapter, National Railway Historical Society, (2005), This Month in Railroad History - August. Retrieved August 22, 2005.